Tutankhamun: Enter the Tomb is a virtual reality short written by Bart Gavigan and directed/produced by Joel Newton that recreates the legendary tomb of King Tutankhamun whilst walking the viewer through the meaning behind what was discovered there. It made its debut in 2019 at the London National History Museum and was met with critical acclaim, going on to win a Lumières Award for Best Educational Virtual Reality Experience. Hugh Bonneville stars as the narrator.

References

External links 
 

Virtual reality films
2019 films
2019 short documentary films
2010s English-language films